Joseph Farrar "Phoney" Smith (June 26, 1905 – October 27, 1985) was a college football player and high school coach and athletic director.

Mercer University
"Phoney" was a prominent halfback for the Mercer Baptists of Mercer University. His brother was Crook Smith. He was elected to the Mercer Athletics Hall of Fame in 1971, and the Georgia Sports Hall of Fame in 1969. Smith was a teammate of later Georgia coach Wally Butts and played for coach Bernie Moore.

1927
Smith was selected All-Southern in 1927. called by one writer "the best athlete who ever put on a Mercer uniform." Smith was the first Southern player to cross the goal line against the "dream and wonder" team of Georgia on a 95-yard kickoff.

Semi pro ball
In the late 1920s, he went on to play semi-pro football with the Ironton Tanks in Ironton, Ohio, a team that was the forerunner of the Cleveland Browns.

South Broward
Smith was a coach and athletic director at South Broward High School, where he taught for more than 20 years.

See also
1927 College Football All-Southern Team

References

External links
 

1905 births
1985 deaths
American football halfbacks
Athletic directors
Mercer Bears football players
High school football coaches in Florida
All-Southern college football players
People from Fayetteville, Tennessee
Players of American football from Tennessee